The following List of awards and nominations received by David L. Cook covers the awards received by David L. Cook since 1997.

References

Cook, David L.